Lewis Haslam (25 April 1856 – 12 September 1922), was a Liberal Party Member of Parliament (MP) in Wales, representing Monmouth Boroughs from 1906 to 1918 and then Newport from 1918 until his death in 1922.

Family and education
Haslam was the son of John Haslam of Gilnow House in Bolton in Lancashire. He was educated at University College School and University College, London. In 1893, he married Helen Norma Dixon of Watlington, Oxfordshire.

Career
Haslam was the director of cotton spinning and manufacturing companies. He has been classified as a genuinely second generation self-made man and was among the most wealthy MPs of his time. He also served as a Justice of the Peace for the county of Lancaster.

Politics
At the 1892 general election he contested the Westhoughton Division of Lancashire, in opposition to Lord Stanley  reducing the Conservative majority by 500 votes. He does not appear to have been a candidate in 1895 but in 1900 he stood in Stamford in Lincolnshire, again without success.

He was eventually returned to the House of Commons at the 1906 Liberal landslide at Monmouth. 

He was a supporter of the coalition government of David Lloyd George and at the 1918 was a recipient of the government coupon, gaining the support of the local Conservative and Liberal Associations.

Along with fellow Coalition Liberal Edgar Rees Jones of the Merthyr constituency, Haslam played a minor role in the discussions behind the Government of Ireland Bill. Haslam in particular was strongly opposed to giving the Irish Parliament control of its own taxes.

The 1922 Newport by-election held after his death marked the end of the Lloyd George Coalition Government.

References

External links 
 

1856 births
1922 deaths
Politics of Newport, Wales
Liberal Party (UK) MPs for Welsh constituencies
UK MPs 1906–1910
UK MPs 1910
UK MPs 1910–1918
UK MPs 1918–1922
People educated at University College School